Galdan Tseren (?–1745) was a Choros (Oirats) prince and the Khong Tayiji of the Dzungar Khanate from 1727 until his death in 1745.

Galdan Tseren was the eldest son of Tsewang Rabtan. After the assassination of his father by rival factions, a civil war followed between his sons of which Galdan Tseren emerged victorious and crowned himself the new Dzungar Khan. Galdan Tseren continued his fathers policies of confrontation with the Qing dynasty. He refused to surrender Lubsan Danjin, the leader of the revolt of the Kokonor (Qinghai) Khoshuts of 1723, and he initiated a policy of harassment of the Khalkha Mongols, the Manchu's allies.

In the spring of 1729, war broke out against the Qing dynasty and Galdan Tseren's forces obtained numerous victories against the Qing. The war dragged on until 1737. Peace negotiations had already started in 1734. In 1737 both sides finally made peace and the Galdan Tseren accepted the condition of tributary.

Galdan Tseren not only viewed war as the only medium to strengthen his kingdom, he also worked to improve its economic and technological base. On his campaigns he captured many learned men and put them to work for the benefit of his state. Turkic oasis dwellers worked on developing irrigation projects for agriculture, he built factories to produce velvet, paper and cloth.

Galdan Tseren possessed a powerful army of 80–100,000 cavalrymen, all armed with firearms and with sufficient mounts. He also developed his own small military industry with the help of captured officers like the Swedish Johan Gustaf Renat.

But the base of Galdan Tseren's finances lay in the profits gained from his control of the trade route between Russia and Qing dynasty, the well known Tea Road, along which valuable Chinese products flowed to Moscow.

Galdan Tseren died in 1745, the Dzungar Khanate that he had strengthened would fall prey to a succession dispute among his three sons, and would later be defeated and subject to genocide by the Qing Qianlong Emperor.

Issue 
Galdan Tseren had the following children:
Sons
Lama Dorji
Tsewang Dorji Namjal
Tsewang Dashi
Daughter
Ulam Bayar

See also
Dzungar–Qing War

References

Bibliography

Dzungar Khanate
1745 deaths
18th-century Mongol rulers
Year of birth unknown